"Sheer Heart Attack" is a song by the British rock band Queen, released on their sixth studio album News of the World in 1977. It is one of two songs on the album entirely written by Roger Taylor, the other being "Fight from the Inside".

Background
"Sheer Heart Attack" was originally written for the Sheer Heart Attack album in 1974, but was not included. It was finished for News of the World in 1977, and is characterized by its fast, even tempo throughout its length, with the raw simplicity and traditionalism of punk rock including an abrupt ending.

Roger Taylor sang lead on the demo, but for the definitive version the band decided Freddie Mercury should sing lead vocals, with Taylor singing the chorus. Taylor plays almost every instrument on the finished track, with some help from Brian May on lead guitar and "screams". This is one of the few original Queen recordings that does not feature bass guitarist John Deacon.

The song was the B-side of the Deacon-penned single "Spread Your Wings" in February 1978. It was also the B-side of the single "It's Late", written by May, which was released only in Canada, the United States, New Zealand and Japan in April 1978.

Live performances
The song was performed live from 1977 to 1984. It has been released on three live albums: Live Killers in 1979, Queen Rock Montreal in 1981, and Queen on Fire - Live at the Bowl in 1982.

Personnel
Information is based on the album's Liner Notes

Freddie Mercury – lead and backing vocals
Brian May – lead guitar
Roger Taylor – lead and backing vocals, drums, rhythm guitar, bass guitar

References

1977 songs
Queen (band) songs
Song recordings produced by Mike Stone (record producer)
Songs written by Roger Taylor (Queen drummer)
British punk rock songs
British hard rock songs